This is a list of Vahanas used in Goan temples.

Palakhi ( also called as Shikbika ),can be wooden ,Silver or sometimes even golden
Lalakhi
Sukhasana
Ratha ( Chariot carried on shoulders by devotees )
Maharatha ( Ter ,chariots pulled by devotees )
Simhavahan
Garudvahan
Nauka ( a boat ," Sangod " in Konkani )
Makhar ( a swing , also called as Dolvahana or Dolyantra )
Ambari ( an elephant )  
Ashwavahana
Vijaya Ratha ( a horse chariot )
Shehsa Vahan 
Gajavahan
Vrushab or Nandi Vahan

See also
Agrashala
Goan temple
List of temples in Goa

References
"Gomantak Prakruti ani Sanskruit",Volume 1,By B.D.Satoskar,Published by Shubhada Saraswat Prakashan,Mumbai.
"Shree Devi Kalika",by Shreepadrao P.Madkaikar,Kalika Prakashan,Goa,April 1984,Pages-5-78

Hinduism in Goa
Hindu temples in Goa